338 Edge (.338/300 Ultra Mag, .338 Ultra Cat) is a Wildcat rifle cartridge based on the .300 Remington Ultra Magnum round necked up to accept 0.338" diameter bullets. It is gaining popularity as a long-range cartridge due to the wide availability of 0.338" projectiles that have a high ballistic coefficient.  For instance, the  Sierra Match King has a ballistic coefficient of 0.765 and is a popular choice for 338 Edge shooters.

Design
The 338 Edge is similar in ballistics to the .338 Lapua Magnum, but can be chambered in a regular magnum action without modification, making it an attractive cartridge for shooters looking for the high performance of .338 Lapua Magnum without requiring a special or custom action.

The name "338 Edge" was coined by Shawn Carlock during his work with the wildcat in 2001 in order to distinguish the cartridge from the (then new) slightly shorter 338 Remington Ultra Magnum.

Velocities in the 338 Edge are high, and the recoil can be substantial enough to make a rifle painful to shoot without a recoil reducing device such as a muzzle brake or suppressor.  Recoil is approximately twice that of the popular .30-06 cartridge, for a given weight rifle.

See also
 Firearms 
 List of rifle cartridges
 8 mm caliber

References

October 2000 issue of "The Accurate Rifle"

External links
Encyclopedia of firearms and ammo of the XX and XXI centuries. 

Pistol and rifle cartridges
Wildcat cartridges